The Duke Blue Devils women's basketball team is the college basketball program representing Duke University in the Atlantic Coast Conference of NCAA Division I.

Team history

In 1974, Duke hired Emma Jean Howard to teach physical education, and to serve as the head coach of the women's basketball and volleyball teams. Initially, women's basketball was played as a club sport. In the first season, 1974–75, the team played locally, finishing second in the state with a 6–7 record. The women's athletic department merged with the men's athletics in 1975, and the second year is considered as the first official season of the program as a varsity sport. Howard remained as the head coach for the next two years. In 1977, Howard remained as the volleyball coach, while Duke moved up to Division I and hired Debbie Leonard to be the head coach of the women's basketball program.

Duke in the WNBA 

Many Duke Women's Basketball players have continued their basketball careers professionally through the WNBA and overseas. As of 2016, 10 former Blue Devils were represented on WNBA Teams. Among those Duke alums include, Mistie Bass ('06, Phoenix Mercury), Alana Beard (‘04, Los Angeles Sparks), Karima Christmas-Kelly (‘11, Minnesota Lynx), Monique Currie ('06, Washington Mystics), Chelsea Gray ('14, Los Angeles Sparks), Lindsey Harding (‘07, Phoenix Mercury), Tricia Liston ('14, Minnesota Lynx), Haley Peters ('14, Atlanta Dream), Jasmine Thomas (‘11, Connecticut Sun), Krystal Thomas (‘11, Washington Mystics), and Elizabeth Williams ('15, Atlanta Dream).

The Minnesota Lynx were crowned WNBA champs in 2015 with Tricia Liston on the roster. In 2016, the Los Angeles Sparks won the WNBA championship with Alana Beard and Chelsea Gray on the roster.

Duke Women's Basketball Overseas 

Duke Women's Basketball has 14 former players playing professionally overseas in the 2016–2017 season. The former Blue Devils playing overseas include, Alana Beard (Duke ‘04, Avenida, Spain), Chante Black (Duke '09, Ramat Hasharon, Israel), Karima Christmas (Duke ‘11, Winnus, South Korea), Monique Currie (Duke ‘06, Woori Bank, South Korea), Chelsea Gray (Duke '14, Abdullah Gul, Turkey), Lindsey Harding (Duke ‘07, Besiktas, Turkey), Haley Peters (Duke ‘14, Girona, Spain), Angela Salvadores (Duke '16, Avenida, Spain), Kathleen Scheer (Duke '12, Hobart Chargers, Australia), Shay Selby (Duke '12, Bodrum, Turkey), Jasmine Thomas (Duke ‘11, Ramat Hasharon), Allison Vernerey (Duke '13, A.S.V. Basket, France), Chloe Wells (Duke ‘14, Araski, Spain), and Elizabeth Williams (Duke '15, Nadezhda Orenburg, Russia).

Year by year
Source:

NCAA tournament results
Duke has appeared in 24 NCAA tournaments with a record of 58-24.

References

External links